Hari Rončević (born 9 December 1963) is a Croatian pop singer and songwriter. He was born in Split, in former Yugoslavia.

After living for 13 years in Zagreb, he returned to his native Split in 2020.

In 2019, he drew media attention for singing live his own version of Marko Perković Thompson's "Bojna Čavoglave".

Rončević has released a total 16 albums. He collaborated with many artists, notably Doris Dragović, Alen Vitasović, Meri Cetinić and Klapa Cambi.

References

External links
 Rončević at Croatia Records
 Rončević at Hit Records

1963 births
Living people
20th-century Croatian male singers
Croatian pop singers
Musicians from Split, Croatia
21st-century Croatian male singers